Khishig-Öndör is a sum (district) of Bulgan Province in northern Mongolia. It is located approximately 160 miles west of Ulaanbataar. In 2009, its population was 3,171.

References 

Districts of Bulgan Province